Anatoli Bogdanov may refer to:
 Anatoli Bogdanov (footballer) (born 1981), Russian footballer
 Anatoli Bogdanov (ice hockey), Soviet ice hockey coach
 Anatoli Bogdanov (sport shooter) (1931–2001), Soviet Olympic champion in shooting
 Anatoli Bogdanov (zoologist) (1834–1896), Russian zoologist and anthropologist